Morgan J. Rielly is an American politician and author serving as a member of the Maine House of Representatives from the 34th district. Elected in November 2020, he assumed office on December 2, 2020.

Early life and education 
Born and raised in Westbrook, Maine, Rielly attended Westbrook High School. He earned a Bachelor of Arts degree in religion and government from Bowdoin College.

Career 
Outside of politics, Rielly has worked as a paralegal with an immigration law firm. He authored his first book, about World War II veterans from Maine in 2014. His second, about immigrants in Maine, was co-written by Reza Jalali and released in 2021. Rielly was elected to the Maine House of Representatives in November 2020 and assumed office on December 2, 2020. In 2021, Rielly drafted legislation that would create a public service program in Maine, with the goal of retaining local college graduates in the state.

References 

Living people
People from Westbrook, Maine
Bowdoin College alumni
Democratic Party members of the Maine House of Representatives
Westbrook High School (Maine) alumni
Year of birth missing (living people)